John O'Leary may refer to:

Arts and entertainment
 John O'Leary (journalist), editor of the Times Higher Education Supplement
 John O'Leary (actor), (1926–2019), American actor in My Chauffeur
 John O'Leary (blues harmonica artist), British blues harmonica player, originally with the band Savoy Brown

Government and politics
 John O'Leary (ambassador) (1947–2005), U.S. ambassador to Chile
 John O'Leary (Fenian) (1830–1907), Irish nationalist who was imprisoned in England
 John O'Leary (Kerry politician) (1933–2015), Irish Fianna Fáil party politician and TD for Kerry South
 John O'Leary (Wexford politician) (1894–1959),  Irish Labour party politician and TD for Wexford
 John F. O'Leary (1926–1987), U.S. head of Federal Energy Administration

Sports
 John O'Leary (Canadian football) (born 1954), Canadian football running back
 John O'Leary (Gaelic footballer) (born 1961), Irish Gaelic footballer
 John O'Leary (golfer) (1949–2020), Irish golfer
 John O'Leary (sport shooter) (1880–?), British Olympic sport shooter
 Jack O'Leary (c. 1929–1983),  American football and basketball coach, college athletics administrator

See also
 John Leary (disambiguation)